The chapters of the Japanese manga series Sgt. Frog are written and illustrated by Mine Yoshizaki and are serialized in the manga magazine Shōnen Ace. The individual chapters are then collected into tankōbon volumes by Kadokawa Shoten, who released the first volume on November 29, 1999, and volume 32 on April 26, 2022. The series follows the Keroro Platoon, a platoon of frog-like alien invaders, as they attempt to take over the Earth from a secret military base beneath the Hinata house.

The series has been licensed for an English-language release in North America by Tokyopop, who released volume 1 on March 9, 2004, and volume 21 on May 10, 2011. Following the shutdown of Tokyopop, in December 2014 Viz Media announced they had the current rights to the Sgt. Frog manga and would be releasing the series digitally only. These are reprints of the original Tokyopop graphic novels.



Volume list

References

Chapters
Sgt. Frog